Nikolsky Uyezd was one of the subdivisions of the Vologda Governorate of the Russian Empire. It was situated in the southern part of the governorate. Its administrative centre was Nikolsk. In terms of present-day administrative borders, the territory of Nikolsky Uyezd is divided between the Nikolsky, Babushkinsky and Kichmengsko-Gorodetsky districts of Vologda Oblast and Podosinovsky District of Kirov Oblast.

Demographics
At the time of the Russian Empire Census of 1897, Nikolsky Uyezd had a population of 172,187. Of these, 99.9% spoke Russian as their native language.

References

 
Uezds of Vologda Governorate
Vologda Governorate
History of Vologda Oblast
History of Kirov Oblast